= VADM =

VADM or Vadm may refer to:

- Virtual axial dipole moment, see Dipole#Field of a static magnetic dipole
- Vice admiral
